This list of philosophy awards is an index to articles about notable awards related to philosophy. The list shows the country of the organization giving the award. Many of the awards are not limited to people from this country.

References

 
philosophy